Alpha Nu Sigma is an American nuclear engineering honor society affiliated with the American Nuclear Society. Alpha Nu Sigma was established to "recognize high scholarship, integrity, and potential achievement among outstanding degree-seeking nuclear engineering students at institutions of higher learning". As of fall 2021, there are 18 active chapters and approximately 2,000 members nationwide.

History 
Alpha Nu Sigma National Honor Society was established by the American Nuclear Society on June 5, 1979. Alpha Nu Sigma quickly grew in size, obtaining 17 chapters and 320 members by its third anniversary in June 1982. By the end of 1985, Alpha Nu Sigma had grown to 23 chapters and 920 members. The Chernobyl disaster occurred in 1986, and growth of the society has struggled since that event.

Symbols 
The motto of Alpha Nu Sigma is "Energy Newly Born Through Wisdom". The symbol of Alpha Nu Sigma contains "three ellipses representing electron orbits surrounding a nucleus of protons and neutrons" with the Greek letters of the society superimposed.

Membership 
Membership selection criteria for Alpha Nu Sigma are outlined in the national honor society's constitution. The criteria are summarized as follows:

 Candidates for membership must be enrolled in a program to pursue an academic degree in an applied-nuclear-science, nuclear-engineering, or nuclear-engineering option curriculum.
 Juniors shall be eligible if they rank in the top quarter of their peer group.
 Seniors and graduate students shall be eligible if they rank in the top third of their peer group.
 Faculty members shall also be eligible for membership.
 Honorary membership may be awarded to individuals who have made "exemplary contributions in the field of nuclear science and engineering that have had seminal permanent impact nationally or internationally".

Chapter list
As of fall 2021, the following table lists the chapters of Alpha Nu Sigma.

Honorary members 
As of spring 2020, the following table lists the 28 honorary members of Alpha Nu Sigma.

See also
 American Nuclear Society

References

External links
Official website

Student organizations established in 1979
Nuclear organizations
Engineering honor societies